Sir Edwin Landseer (1802–1873) was a British painter.

Landseer may also refer to:

 Landseer (dog), a black-and-white variant of the Newfoundland, named after the painter
 Landseer (horse) (1999–2002), thoroughbred racehorse trained in Ireland

People with the surname 
 Albert Henry Landseer (1829–1906), South Australian politician and businessman
 Charles Landseer (1799–1879), English painter
 Jessica Landseer (1810–1880), English landscape and miniature painter
 John Landseer (1769–1852), English landscape engraver
 Thomas Landseer (c.1793–1880), English artist

See also
 Landseer Park, Suffolk, England
 Landser (disambiguation)